FHU may refer to:
 Fair Haven Union High School, in Vermont, United States
 Foundation of Human Understanding
 Freed–Hardeman University, in Henderson, Tennessee, United States
 Handball Federation of Ukraine
 Ice Hockey Federation of Ukraine
 Sierra Vista Municipal Airport, in Arizona, United States